Bonum sane is a motu proprio on Saint Joseph written by Pope Benedict XV and delivered on July 25, 1920.

In 1870 Pope Pius IX issued the decree "Quemadmodum Deus", proclaiming Saint Joseph Patron of the Church. In commemoration of the fiftieth anniversary of the proclamation, in 1920 Pope Benedict XV issued a motu proprio, "Bonum Sane".

Description
In it Benedict takes notes of the economic hardship and moral laxity occasioned by the recent World War, and cautions about "the advent of a universal republic, which is based on the absolute equality of men and the communion of goods, and in which there is no longer any distinction of nationality, does not recognize the authority of the father upon the children, nor the public authorities and citizens, nor of God on the men in civilian consortium. All things which, if implemented, would lead to terrible social convulsions, like that already happening now in no small part of Europe."

He proposed that instead of being drawn to socialism, "the sworn enemy of Christian principles", working men should follow Saint Joseph as their guide and special patron.
Benedict quoted his predecessor, Leo XIII:

He emphasized that the family is the "core and basis" of human society, and encouraged families to be guided by the example of the Holy Family. Benedict affirmed that strengthening the domestic society with purity, harmony and fidelity, would not only effect an improvement in private morals, but also in the life of the community.

Referencing the practices of honoring St. Joseph during the month of March, and on Wednesdays, he called on the bishops to promote veneration of Saint Joseph.

Notes

External links
 Bonum Sane (nl)
 Pope Benedict XV, Bonum sane, June 25, 1920, Copyright Libreria Editrice Vaticana 
 "Quemadmodum Deus"

1920 in Christianity

1920 documents
20th-century Christian texts
Latin words and phrases
Motu proprio of Pope Benedict XV